Tunstall is a village and civil parish in the Richmondshire
It had a population of 253 increasing to 271 at the 2011 census.

History 
Tunstall was mentioned in the Domesday Book in 1096 as being in the hundred of "Land of Count Alan" and the county of Yorkshire, the population was estimated at 14.8 households.

  In 1870-72 John Marius Wilson's Imperial Gazetteer of England and Wales described Tunstall as:"a township-chapelry in Catterick parish, N. R. Yorkshire; 3 miles S of Catterick-Bridge r. station. Post town, Catterick. Acres, 1,262. Real property, £2,139. Pop., 293. Houses, 66. The living is annexed to Catterick. The church was built in 1847. There are a Wesleyan chapel and a slightly endowed school."

Governance 
The village lies within the Richmond (Yorks) parliamentary constituency, which is under the control of the Conservative Party. The current Member of Parliament, since the 2015 general election, is Rishi Sunak. Tunstall also lies within the Scotton ward of Richmondshire District Council.

Community and culture 
The church was built in 1846 as a chapel of ease to St Michael and All Angels in neighbouring Hudswell. The building was grade II listed in 1969. Tunstall has one public house, The Bay Horse, which is tied to the Yorkshire-based brewer Samuel Smith.

References

External links

Villages in North Yorkshire
Civil parishes in North Yorkshire